Sten Sjögren (born 28 April 1957) is a Swedish former handball player who competed in the 1984 Summer Olympics and in the 1988 Summer Olympics.

References

1957 births
Living people
Swedish male handball players
Olympic handball players of Sweden
Handball players at the 1984 Summer Olympics
Handball players at the 1988 Summer Olympics